Karl Lewis Geary (born 29 June 1982) is an English cricketer. Geary is a right-handed batsman who plays primarily as a wicket-keeper. He was born at Nuneaton, Warwickshire.

Geary represented the Leicestershire Cricket Board in two List A matches against the Northamptonshire Cricket Board and the Kent Cricket Board in the 1st and 2nd rounds of the 2002 Cheltenham & Gloucester Trophy which were held in 2001.

He currently plays club cricket for Leicester Ivanhoe Cricket Club in the Leicestershire and Rutland Cricket League.

References

External links
Carl Geary at Cricinfo
Carl Geary at CricketArchive

1982 births
Living people
Sportspeople from Nuneaton
English cricketers
Leicestershire Cricket Board cricketers
Wicket-keepers